Watertown Township is one of the twenty-two townships of Washington County, Ohio, United States.  The 2000 census found 1,563 people in the township.

Geography
Located in the northwestern part of the county, it borders the following townships:
Waterford Township - north
Adams Township - northeast
Muskingum Township - east
Warren Township - southeast
Barlow Township - south
Palmer Township - west
Windsor Township, Morgan County - northwest

No municipalities are located in Watertown Township, although the unincorporated community of Watertown lies in the township's center.

Name and history
It is the only Watertown Township statewide. Established June 4, 1806.  Largest township in Washington County. This township was first known as Wooster Township.  In a later meeting of the county commissioners set off of Waterford and attached to Wooster that part of the town of Waterford lying in Township 3, Ranges 10 & 11 and so much of 
Township 8, Range 11 as it lies south of the West Branch of Wolf Creek.  In 1813, Sections 31-36 of Union Township were set off and annexed to Wooster.  The name was changed from Wooster to Waterford on December 6, 1824.  This was done to avoid confusion with Wooster Township in Wayne County, Ohio.  Watertown was named in honor of Sherman Waterman who was killed by the Indians in 1795.  In 1877 Watertown received part of Union Township when it was dissolved.  It included the whole of Township 3, Range 9, Sections 31-36.  This tract was originally part of Marietta & Adams Townships. Watertown as it existed before 1813 had originally been a part of Waterford.

Government
The township is governed by a three-member board of trustees, who are elected in November of odd-numbered years to a four-year term beginning on the following January 1. Two are elected in the year after the presidential election and one is elected in the year before it. There is also an elected township fiscal officer, who serves a four-year term beginning on April 1 of the year after the election, which is held in November of the year before the presidential election. Vacancies in the fiscal officership or on the board of trustees are filled by the remaining trustees.

References

External links
County website

Townships in Washington County, Ohio
Townships in Ohio